No More Women is a 1924 American silent comedy film directed by Lloyd Ingraham and starring Matt Moore, Madge Bellamy, and Kathleen Clifford.

Plot
As described in a film magazine review, Peter Maddox, a poor but capable geologist, is disappointed in love. He vows, "no more women." Wealthy Peggy Van Dyke decides that she will marry him. She follows him to his camp, pretends that she is ill, and removes a necessary part of his automobile engine to keep him with her. When she falls asleep, he leaves. Thieves seize her, so her dog goes after Peter. He returns and rescues her. He then declares his love for Peggy.

Cast

References

Bibliography
 Munden, Kenneth White. The American Film Institute Catalog of Motion Pictures Produced in the United States, Part 1. University of California Press, 1997.

External links

1924 films
1924 comedy films
1920s English-language films
American silent feature films
Silent American comedy films
American black-and-white films
Films directed by Lloyd Ingraham
1920s American films